Opera Ball (German: Opernball) is a 1956 Austrian musical comedy film directed by Ernst Marischka and starring Johannes Heesters, Hertha Feiler and Josef Meinrad. Based on the 1898 operetta Der Opernball, it is part of the operetta film tradition. A previous film version had been made in 1939.

The film's sets were designed by the art director Fritz Jüptner-Jonstorff. It was shot using Agfacolor.

Cast
 Johannes Heesters as Georg Dannhauser 
 Hertha Feiler as Elisabeth, seine Frau 
 Josef Meinrad as Paul Hollinger 
 Sonja Ziemann as Helene Hollinger, seine Frau 
 Adrian Hoven as Richard Stelzer 
 Rudolf Vogel as Eduard von Lamberg 
 Fita Benkhoff as Hermine, seine Frau 
 Theo Lingen as Philipp, Diener bei Dannhauser 
 Dorit Kreysler as Hanni, Dienstmädchen bei Dannhauser 
 Frances Martin as Mizzi Schuster 
 Hans Moser as Anton Hatschek, Oberkellner

References

Bibliography 
 Waldman, Harry. Nazi Films in America, 1933-1942. McFarland, 2008.

External links 
 

1956 films
1950s historical musical films
Austrian historical musical films
1950s German-language films
Films directed by Ernst Marischka
Films set in the 19th century
Operetta films